HMS Conqueror was a 74-gun third-rate ship of the line of the Royal Navy, launched on 23 November 1801 at Harwich. She was designed by Sir John Henslow as part of the middling class of 74s, and was the only ship built to her draught. Whereas the common class carried 28 18-pounder guns on their upper gun decks, the middling class carried 30, and only ten 9-pounder guns on their quarterdecks instead of the 12 of the common class.

She fought at Trafalgar under the command of Captain Israel Pellew, brother of Sir Edward Pellew. Pellew's captain of marines took the surrender of the overall commander of the French-Spanish fleet, Admiral Villeneuve, aboard the French ship Bucentaure (80 guns). However, he was not able to deliver Villeneuve's sword to the Conqueror as she had passed on to engage another ship and it was received by the captain of Mars.

Villeneuve, who spoke English, is alleged to have asked to whom he was surrendering. On being told it was Captain Pellew of the Conqueror, he replied "I am glad to have struck to the fortunate Sir Edward Pellew." When he was informed that the Conqueror's captain was Sir Edward's brother, he said, "His brother? What, are there two of them? Hėlas!" 

On 2 February 1812, Conqueror was driven ashore on the coast of England between Sheerness and Chatham, Kent, during a storm.

Conqueror was broken up in 1822.

Notes

References

Lavery, Brian (2003) The Ship of the Line - Volume 1: The development of the battlefleet 1650-1850. Conway Maritime Press. .

Ships of the line of the Royal Navy
1801 ships
Ships built in Harwich
Maritime incidents in 1812